Raissa Feudjio Tchuanyo (born 29 October 1995) is a Cameroonian professional footballer who plays as a midfielder for Spanish  Liga F club UD Granadilla Tenerife and the Cameroon women's national team. She has previously played for Trabzon İdmanocağı in the Turkish Women's First Football League and for Merilappi United and Åland United in the Finnish Naisten Liiga. She represented Cameroon at the 2012 Summer Olympics.

References

1995 births
Living people
Footballers from Yaoundé
Cameroonian women's footballers
Women's association football midfielders
Trabzon İdmanocağı women's players
UD Granadilla Tenerife players
Cameroon women's international footballers
Olympic footballers of Cameroon
Footballers at the 2012 Summer Olympics
2015 FIFA Women's World Cup players
2019 FIFA Women's World Cup players
Cameroonian expatriate women's footballers
Cameroonian expatriate sportspeople in Turkey
Expatriate women's footballers in Turkey
Cameroonian expatriate sportspeople in Finland
Expatriate women's footballers in Finland
Cameroonian expatriate sportspeople in Spain
Expatriate women's footballers in Spain